AAOC may refer to:

 Albanian American Organization Chameria, a non governmental organization
 Australian Army Ordnance Corps, former designation of the Royal Australian Army Ordnance Corps